The English expedition to France 1562-1563 was an episode in the First French War of Religion (1562-1563); it resulted in English defeat and England relinquishing its claims to Calais and the surrounding area.

Background
On 8 May 1562, Protestant reformers took the city of Le Havre, looted churches, and expelled Catholics. Fearing a counter-attack by the royal armies, they turned to the English who sent their troops.

Elizabeth I saw an opportunity in the current state of chaos in France to reclaim the Pale of Calais, which had only recently been lost in the Anglo-French War (1557–1559) after two centuries of English rule. On 22 September 1562, the Treaty of Richmond was signed by Elizabeth and Huguenot leader Louis, Prince of Condé, by which it was agreed that England would send 3,000 men to occupy the cities of Le Havre and Dieppe. On arrival the English built a series of fortifications.

English failure
In 1563, peace was restored between the Huguenots and French Catholics with the Edict of Amboise.  However, when requested to leave the cities it was still occupying, Elizabeth refused, stating that English forces would hold out until France restored Calais to English rule. In response the French regent, Catherine de' Medici, sent a force of French Catholic and Huguenots under Anne de Montmorency. The French attacked the city of Le Havre and expelled the English on 29 July 1563.  The fort the English had constructed was then razed.

Consequences
The English failure led to the Treaty of Troyes (1564); Elizabeth accepted French rule over Calais in exchange for 120,000 crowns. Elizabeth felt betrayed by the Huguenots, and would never trust them again. As a result, Elizabeth refused to send assistance in 1572, despite Huguenot pleas, as France descended into violence yet again.

References

1562 in France
1563 in France
1562 in England
1563 in England
Anglo-French wars
French Wars of Religion